Beni Yagoub is a town and commune in Djelfa Province, Algeria.

References

Communes of Djelfa Province
Djelfa Province